MV Aegean Odyssey is a cruise ship owned and operated by Voyages to Antiquity, a one-ship cruise company established in 2009. Originally built as a ferry, it was converted to a cruise ship in 1988, and substantially rebuilt again in 2010.

History
Built in 1973 as the Zim ro-ro ferry Narcis, she was bought by Dolphin Hellas Cruises in 1986, and renamed Aegean Dolphin after conversion to a cruise ship in 1988 in Perama. In 1995 the ship was listed as operating for Epirotiki Line. It was renamed Aegean I whilst on charter to Renaissance Cruises in 1996. Then the ship operated for Golden Sun Cruises on Mediterranean cruises since 1997–1998, still owned by Dolphin Hellas. In 2005, she was bought by Louis Hellenic Cruise Lines, but the deal fell through due to legal problems, and the ship was laid up.
She was bought by the new cruise company 'Voyages to Antiquity' in 2009, as part of a new venture by cruise line veteran Gerry Herrod. The cruise was operated by Turkish travel agency Etstur in 2013 and 2015 summer seasons for Greek Islands tours. 

The ship has been refitted and renovated in Ermoupoli on the Greek island of Syros to cater for cruising in the coastal waters of the central and southern Mediterranean – she can visit ports that are too small for most cruise ships and began operation again in May 2010, renamed Aegean Odyssey.

The passenger capacity was reduced from 570 to around 380, in order to provide more spacious accommodation; the cinema was removed in favour of a lecture hall, and new dining areas established.

The ship's ownership changed, four days before its inaugural cruise departure, on 30/4/10. Its registered owner is Samos (Island) Maritime Co. Ltd based in Piraeus.

On August 22, 2019, The US not-for-profit organization Road Scholar announced a 3-year charter of the ship, to run from April 2020 to April 2023, undertaking educational voyages.

It was announced, the Ship company owner Voyages to Antiquity ends its services at end of October 2019, also the Oxford office is to close, due the several stops of ship because motor failure and trips cancelled. From April 2020 the ship will be chartered to Road Scholar.

References

External links

'Voyages to Antiquity.com Voyages to Antiquity web site
Aegean Odyssey Review Bullshead. Cruise Critic
Aegean Odyssey Review Lives to Travel. Cruise Critic
Aegean Odyssey – Ship Description. Cruiseabout
MV Aegean Odyssey. Voyages to Antiquity
History of the ship on operators' postcards, Simplon Postcards

Cruise ships
1972 ships